FC Kryvbas Kryvyi Rih is a Ukrainian professional football club based in Kryvyi Rih. The club currently competes in the Ukrainian Premier League. Note that the club in summer of 2020 has been renamed from Hirnyk Kryvyi Rih which was reestablished in 2017.

History

Hirnyk Kryvyi Rih
After a year of absence, in 2017 Hirnyk Kryvyi Rih was reestablished and entered the Ukrainian Amateur competition following which it regained professional status for the 2018–19 season.

Kryvbas Kryvyi Rih
On 29 July 2020 the president of Hirnyk Kostiantyn Karamanits confirmed that his team would be renamed into Kryvbas before the start of the 2020–21 Ukrainian Second League season. Later it changed to Kryvbas Kryvyi Rih. The club's rebranding was triggered on petition of Ukrainian President Volodymyr Zelensky.<ref>Liubomyr Chotyrbok. Revived "Kryvbas" by killing "Hirnyk": How deputy Yuzik fulfilled the request of Zelensky (Восстановили "Кривбасс", убив "Горняк": Как депутат Юзик выполнил поручение Зеленского). Sector.depo.ua. 5 August 2020</ref>Ivan Serdiuk. Who and why began to revive FC Kryvbas after 7 years of nonexistence (Кто и зачем принялся возрождать ФК «Кривбасс» после 7 лет небытия?). Kryvbass.city. 19 August 2020 It is the second time the club was renamed as Kryvbas, previously also were known as Kryvbas-Ruda.

In interview to Artur Valerko in July 2013 right after the original Kryvbas was declared bankrupt, the football historian Vasyl Hnatiuk has foreseen the transition of Hirnyk to Kryvbas. On 20 August 2020 there took place official presentation of the new Kryvbas. At the presentation the Verkhovna Rada People's Deputy of Ukraine Yurii Koriavchenkov explained that the process started back in 2015 when on efforts of fans there was created a public organization "Kryvbas maie buty" (Kryvbas has to be) and Serhiy Mazur asked us at that time members of studio "Kvartal-95" with request to help with revival of Kryvbas. The club's president remained the president of former Hirnyk Kostiantyn Karamanits, vice-president on development of youth football became Serhiy Mazur, vice-president on fans cooperation Vadym Ivashchenko, vice-president of communication and public relations Artem Mykhailichenko, head of board of trustees became Yurii Koriavchenkov. It was also announced the history of Hirnyk did not end and its club's academy will continue to work under the brand of Hirnyk and develop young talents for the main squad of the revived Kryvbas.

The new Kryvbas played its first game against FC Cherkashchyna as part of the 2020–21 Ukrainian Cup and won it 4:2. The game had several spectators and was visited by the President of Ukraine Volodymyr Zelensky. During the game some fans spread a banner with a saying "Zelensky three, two, one, shames our Kryvbas".If stadium, then stadium it is: Zelensky was allowed to kick off the first ball at the FC Kryvbas game (Стадион, так стадион: Зеленскому дали разыграть первый мяч на матче ФК «Кривбасс»). Pervyi Krivorozhskiy. 26 August 2020

Stadiums and training facilities

The club's main stadium is Hirnyk, formerly Zhovtneva Mine Stadium. It is located at Kolonkovska street. The stadium has capacity of 2,500 seats and its field consists of natural grass and has size 105х67 meters. Besides its main field, the club has also a training complex. The club's training complex is based around former Rodina Mine Stadium located at Svitlohorska street.

Youth football school Hirnyk
The club's school was founded on 1 June 2003. The school provides its pupils aged 3 to 17 with extracurriculum activities in football.

League and cup history

{|class="wikitable"
|- style="background:#efefef;"
! Season
! Div.
! Pos.
! Pl.
! W
! D
! L
! GS
! GA
! P
!Domestic Cup
!colspan=2|Europe
!Notes
|-
| style="text-align:center;" colspan="14"|FC Hirnyk Kryvyi Rih has reestablished
|- style="background:SteelBlue;"
|align=center|2017–18
|align=center|4th Amateur League Gr. 3
|align=center|5
|align=center|16 	
|align=center|6 	
|align=center|2 	
|align=center|8 	
|align=center|44 	
|align=center|35 	
|align=center|20
|align=center|
|align=center|
|align=center|
|  style="text-align:center; background:lightgreen;"|Applied
|- style="background:PowderBlue;"
|align=center|2018–19
|align=center|3rd Second League Gr. B
|  style="text-align:center; background:tan;"|3
|align=center|27
|align=center|15
|align=center|6
|align=center|6
|align=center|53
|align=center|33
|align=center|51
|align=center| finals
|align=center|
|align=center|
|align=center|
|- style="background:PowderBlue;"
| style="text-align:center;"|2019–20
| style="text-align:center;"|3rd Second League Gr. B
| style="text-align:center;"|4
| style="text-align:center;"|20
| style="text-align:center;"|10
| style="text-align:center;"|3
| style="text-align:center;"|7
| style="text-align:center;"|33
| style="text-align:center;"|22
| style="text-align:center;"|33
| style="text-align:center;"| finals
| style="text-align:center;"|
| style="text-align:center;"|
| style="text-align:center;"|
|-
| style="text-align:center;" colspan="14"|Restructured as FC Kryvbas Kryvyi Rih based on FC Hirnyk Kryvyi Rih
|- style="background:PowderBlue;"
| style="text-align:center;"|2020–21
| style="text-align:center;"|3rd Second League Gr. B
|  style="text-align:center; background:silver;"|2
| style="text-align:center;"|21| style="text-align:center;"|14| style="text-align:center;"|5| style="text-align:center;"|2| style="text-align:center;"|50| style="text-align:center;"|14| style="text-align:center;"|47''
| style="text-align:center;"| finals
| style="text-align:center;"|
| style="text-align:center;"|
|  style="text-align:center; background:lightgreen;"|Promoted
|- style="background:LightCyan;"
| style="text-align:center;"|2021–22
| style="text-align:center;"|2nd First League
|  style="text-align:center; background:silver;"|2
| style="text-align:center;"|20
| style="text-align:center;"|12
| style="text-align:center;"|6
| style="text-align:center;"|2
| style="text-align:center;"|38
| style="text-align:center;"|17
| style="text-align:center;"|42
| style="text-align:center;"| finals
| style="text-align:center;"|
| style="text-align:center;"|
|  style="text-align:center; background:lightgreen;"|Promoted
|- 
| style="text-align:center;"|2022–23
| style="text-align:center;"|1st Premier League
| style="text-align:center;"|
| style="text-align:center;"|
| style="text-align:center;"|
| style="text-align:center;"|
| style="text-align:center;"|
| style="text-align:center;"|
| style="text-align:center;"|
| style="text-align:center;"|
| style="text-align:center;"|
| style="text-align:center;"|
| style="text-align:center;"|
| style="text-align:center;"|
|}

Players

Current squad

Out on loan

Personnel

Technical staff

See also
 FC Kryvbas-2 Kryvyi Rih

Notes

References

External links
 FC Kryvbas Kryvyi Rih

2020 establishments in Ukraine
Association football clubs established in 2020
Football clubs in Kryvyi Rih
Ukrainian Premier League clubs